João Barroso Soares (born 29 August 1949 in São Cristóvão e São Lourenço, Lisbon) is a Portuguese editor and Socialist Party politician, who was President of the Municipality of Lisbon from 1995 to 2002.

He is the son of the former Portuguese Prime Minister and President, Mário Soares, and the actress Maria Barroso. He was married to Maria Olímpia Soares (b. 1951), daughter of António Domingos de Oliveira Soares and wife Clotilde Soares, by whom he had three children: Maria Inês (b. 1976), Maria Mafalda (b. 1981) and Mário Alberto (b. 1987). Later divorced, he married the Belgian Annick Burhenne, by whom he had a son Jonas (b. 2003), named after Jonas Savimbi, of whom João Soares is an admirer, and a daughter Lilah (b. 2007).

He was member of the European Parliament and of the Portuguese State Council.

In 2004, he lost to Manuel Alegre and José Sócrates a bid for the party leadership, and in October 2005 lost to Fernando Seara the election for President of the Municipality of Sintra. He also lost the election for president of the Municipality of Lisbon to Pedro Santana Lopes, in 2001, being the first mayor of Lisboa to lose a reelection.

In July 2008 he was elected President of the OSCE Parliamentary Assembly. He was reelected for another one-year term in July 2009.

During the 2008 and 2012 United States elections, he acted as the special coordinator for the OSCE International Observation Misson.

In April 2016, in a Facebook post, João Soares, Minister of Culture, said that he looked forward to landing "salutary blows" on two newspaper columnists. The post attracted hundreds of critical comments from the public, opposition politicians and journalists. Mr Soares, resigned after Prime Minister António Costa reprimanded him and issued a public apology. He initially defended his comments as a response to an "insulting personal attack", but later apologised.

Honours
 Grand-Cross of the Order of Bernardo O'Higgins, Chile (30 September 2001)

References

1949 births
Living people
Mayors of Lisbon
Socialist Party (Portugal) politicians
Socialist Party (Portugal) MEPs
MEPs for Portugal 1994–1999
Culture ministers of Portugal